The CMLL Universal Championship 2013 (Campeonato Universal in Spanish) was a professional wrestling tournament produced by the Consejo Mundial de Lucha Libre (CMLL) promotion, which took place over three shows between August 23 and September 6, 2013, in Arena México, Mexico City, Mexico. The CMLL Universal Championship is an annual tournament of CMLL champions that was first held in 2009.

Background
The tournament featured 15 professional wrestling matches under single-elimination tournament rules, which means that wrestlers were eliminated when they lose a match. There were no specific storylines that build to the tournament, which has been held annually since 2009. All male "non-regional" CMLL champions at the time of the tournament were involved in the tournament with the exception of the reigning CMLL World Mini-Estrella and Mexican National Lightweight Champions, who have never taken part in the tournament. Regionally promoted championships such as the CMLL Arena Coliseo Tag Team Championship and the Occidente championships promoted in Guadalajara, Jalisco were not included in the tournament; only titles that have been defended in CMLL's main venue Arena Mexico were included. The tournament was divided into two qualifying blocks, which took place on August 23 and August 30, while the final took place on September 6, 2013.

2013 Universal Championship tournament
When CMLL announced the 2013 tournament the following champions were eligible to participate:

Reigning CMLL World Tag Team Champion Jushin Thunder Liger did not take part in the tournament. For the third year in a row, New Japan Pro-Wrestling representative Hiroshi Tanahashi entered the tournament as an outsider.

Block A

Block A took place on August 23, 2013, and featured eight champions wrestling for a place in the finals.

Block B

Block B took place on August 30, 2013, and featured eight champions wrestling for a place in the finals. Diamante Azul was scheduled to take part in the block, but had to pull out due to an injury and was replaced by CMLL Arena Coliseo Tag Team Champion Okumura.

Finals
The finals of the tournament took place on September 6, 2013, and saw Tanahashi defeat Rush two falls to one to become the 2013 Universal Champion.

References

2013 in professional wrestling
CMLL Universal Championship